A. Peter Bailey (born February 24, 1938) is an American journalist, author, and lecturer. He was an associate of Malcolm X's and a member of the Organization of Afro-American Unity.

Biography

Alfonzo Peter Bailey was born in Columbus, Georgia, on February 24, 1938, and raised in Tuskegee, Alabama. He was in the U.S. Army from 1956 to 1959, and attended Howard University until 1961.

In 1962, Bailey moved to Harlem. That June, he heard Malcolm X speak near Mosque No. 7. When Malcolm X left the Nation of Islam in 1964, Bailey became a founding member of his Organization of Afro-American Unity. Bailey served as editor of the group's newsletter, titled Blacklash. He was a pallbearer at Malcolm X's funeral in 1965.

Bailey served as associate editor at Ebony from 1968 to 1975. He was associate director of the Black Theatre Alliance (BTA) from 1975 to 1981, and he edited the BTA Newsletter.

In 1998, he wrote Seventh Child: A Family Memoir of Malcolm X with Malcolm X's nephew, Rodnell Collins. He wrote Revelations: The Autobiography of Alvin Ailey in 1995 based on interviews he conducted with the choreographer in the years before his 1989 death. In 2013, he wrote a memoir titled Witnessing Brother Malcolm X: The Master Teacher.

Bailey has contributed articles to The Black Collegian, Black Enterprise, Black World, Essence, Jet, The Negro Digest, the New York Daily News, and The New York Times. He writes a bimonthly column for the Trice-Edney Wire Service.

Bailey has lectured about Malcolm X at three dozen colleges and universities, and taught as an adjunct professor at Hunter College, the University of the District of Columbia, and Virginia Commonwealth University.

Selected bibliography
Harlem: Precious Memories, Great Expectations. .
Revelations: The Autobiography of Alvin Ailey with Alvin Ailey. .
Seventh Child: A Family Memoir of Malcolm X with Rodnell P. Collins. .
Witnessing Brother Malcolm X: The Master Teacher. .

References

External links
Bailey's website
A 1990 interview by David Mills for The Washington Post
Interview with A. Peter Bailey, June 26, 2013, March on Washington 50th Anniversary Oral History Project, District of Columbia Public Library
A. Peter Bailey collection at the Stuart A. Rose Manuscript, Archives, and Rare Book Library

1938 births
Living people
African-American activists
African-American academics
African-American journalists
American male journalists
African-American writers
Howard University alumni
Hunter College faculty
Malcolm X
University of the District of Columbia faculty
Virginia Commonwealth University faculty
Activists from Alabama
Activists from Georgia (U.S. state)
Academics from Alabama
Academics from Georgia (U.S. state)